The 2000–01 season was the 92nd year of football played by Dundee United, and covers the period from 1 July 2000 to 30 June 2001. United finished in eleventh place in the Scottish Premier League, in the first year of the league split, forced by the expansion to twelve teams.

United were knocked out of both domestic cup competitions by the Old Firm - to Rangers in the CIS Insurance Cup quarter-finals and to eventual winners Celtic in the Tennent's Scottish Cup semi-finals.

Match results
Dundee United played a total of 46 competitive matches during the 2000–01 season. The team finished eleventh in the Scottish Premier League.

In the cup competitions, United were knocked out of the CIS Cup at the semi-finals stage, losing to Rangers. Celtic knocked United out of the Tennent's Scottish Cup at the semi-final stage. Both matches finished 1–0.

Legend

All results are written with Dundee United's score first.

Bank of Scotland Premierleague

Tennent's Scottish Cup

CIS Insurance Cup

United beat Airdrieonians 4–3 on penalties

Player details
During the 2000–01 season, United used 41 different players, with a further two named as substitutes who did not make an appearance on the pitch. The table below shows the number of appearances and goals scored by each player.

|}

Goalscorers
Seventeen players scored for the United first team with the team scoring 46 goals in total. Derek Lilley was the top goalscorer, scoring seven goals.

Discipline
During the 2000–01 season, six United players were sent off, and 24 players received at least one yellow card. In total, the team received seven dismissals and 79 cautions.

Team statistics

League table

Transfers

In
Sixteen players were signed during the 2000–01 season, with a total (public) transfer cost of around £350,000. In addition, one player was signed on loan.

The players that joined Dundee United during the 2000-01 season, along with their previous club, are listed below.

Loans in

Out
Sixteen players left the club during the season with only one transfer - Scott McCulloch to Cardiff City - bringing in a fee (£100k).

Listed below are the players that were released during the season, along with the club that they joined. Players did not necessarily join their next club immediately.

Loans out

Playing kit

The jerseys were sponsored for a fifth season by Telewest. The away kit sometimes used the home shorts and socks.

Trivia
Of Derek Lilley's six league goals, only one - in the 3–1 defeat at Dunfermline - failed to achieve points for United.

Awards
Alex Smith
Scottish Premier League Manager of the Month: 2
 March 2001, May 2001

See also
2000–01 Scottish Premier League
2000–01 Scottish Cup
2000–01 in Scottish football

References

External links
Soccerbase
Results
Squad stats
Transfers
United goals 2000–01

2000-01
Scottish football clubs 2000–01 season